The Lords of Cemais were the ruling families, from the early 12th century of the Marcher Lordship (aka Palatine Barony) of Kemes, and in later centuries of the barony of Cemais in Wales.

 Martin de Turribus, fl. 1090's.
 Robert fitz Martin, c.1095? - died c.1159
 William I FitzMartin, c.1155-1209, husband of Angharad, daughter of Rhys ap Gruffydd, prince of the briefly re-established Deheubarth.
 William II FitzMartin, 1177?-1216
 William, Lord Martin, 1257–1324
 William, Lord Martin, 1296–1326; his sole heir was the son of his deceased sister, Joan, the wife of the first Baron Audley:
 James Audley, 2nd Baron Audley, 1312–1386
 Nicholas Audley, 3rd Baron Audley, c.1330-1391; title went into abeyance until being inherited by his sister's son:
 John Tuchet, 4th Baron Audley, d. 1409
 James Tuchet, 5th Baron Audley, d. 1459
 John Tuchet, 6th Baron Audley, d. 1491
 James Tuchet, 7th Baron Audley, c.1465-1497, who was executed for treason and the Marcher Lorship forfeit. It was eventually re-established as a Barony, in the year of the Laws in Wales Acts (which abolished all Marcher Lordships), for his son:
 John Tuchet, 8th Baron Audley, d. 1558, who sold it in 1539 to
 William Owen, c. 1488–1574, a local lawyer
 George Owen, 1552–1613
 Alban Owen, 1580–1656
 David Owen, fl. 1651
 William Owen, c.1654-1721
 Elizabeth Owen, d. 1746
 Anne Owen, d. c.1720?
 William Lloyd, d. 1734
 Anne Lloyd, c. 1715-1775
 Colonel Thomas Lloyd, 1740–1807
 Thomas Lloyd, 1788–1845
 Sir Thomas Davies Lloyd, bart., 1820–1877
 Sir Marteine Lloyd, bart., 1851–1933
 Nesta Lloyd Withington, d.1943
 Morfa Withington Winser, 1920–1958
 Joan Gregson Ellis, d. 1973
 Hyacinthe Hawkesworth, married John Hawkesworth in 1943
Heir presumptative: John Phillip Cemaes Hawkesworth, 1947–2006Heir presumptative: Alexander Hawkesworth

Sources
 The Lords of Cemais, Dilwynn Miles, Haverfordwest, 1997.

References

Anglo-Normans in Wales
History of Pembrokeshire
Welsh noble families